Gordan Grlić-Radman (born 6 June 1958) is a Croatian diplomat and politician serving as Minister of Foreign and European Affairs since 2019.

Early life and education
Grlić-Radman was born in Prisoje near Tomislavgrad, PR Bosnia and Herzegovina, FPR Yugoslavia in 1958. He studied at the XIV Gymnasium in Zagreb till 1977 and got a bachelor's degree at the Faculty of Agriculture of the University of Zagreb in 1982.

In 1991, Grlić-Radman also completed a two-year degree at the Institut für Kaderschule management school in Bern, Switzerland. In 2002, he graduated in international relations from the Faculty of Political Science of the University of Zagreb, where he obtained a PhD in 2007 with a dissertation on "Neutrality and New European Security Architecture".

Professional career 
Grlić-Radman started his career in business, working in Switzerland for Melior-Haefliger AG from 1984 to 1991. In those years he was active in the Croatian diaspora as president of the Croatian Cultural Community in Switzerland (1984–1988) and co-sponsor of the Croatian-Swiss Business Consult with Davor Pavuna.

From 1991 to 1992, Grlić-Radman worked as Business Secretary of the Faculty of Medicine in Zagreb (headed by Mate Granić, whom he befriended) and volunteered for the Office for Refugees and Displaced Persons of the Government of Croatia (working with diaspora) and for the Croatian Health Service (Humanitarian Aid).

Diplomatic career

In 1992 and later, Grlić-Radman helped set up the diplomatic and consular missions of newly independent Croatia in Bern, Geneva and Zurich.
Grlić-Radman then served in the Croatian embassies to Bulgaria (1994–1996) and Hungary, headed by Zdenko Škrabalo (1996–1997). From 1997 to 2012, he worked with Mate Granić at the Croatian Foreign Ministry, among other things as Head of the Central European Department (2004–2009) and Secretary of the Danube Commission (2011–2014). From 2010 to 2012 he headed the Center for International Studies.

In 2012, Grlić-Radman was appointed by Davor Ivo Stier as the Ambassador to Hungary. In October 2017, he was appointed as Ambassador to Germany.

On 19 July 2019, Grlić-Radman was appointed to replace Marija Pejčinović Burić as Minister of Foreign and European Affairs in the Cabinet of Andrej Plenković.

Personal life 
Grlić-Radman is married and father of three children. He is a practising Roman Catholic. He speaks German, English, Bulgarian, and Hungarian but not fluently.

References

1958 births
Living people
Ambassadors of Croatia to Germany
Ambassadors of Croatia to Hungary
Croatian Democratic Union politicians
Croatian diplomats
Croats of Bosnia and Herzegovina
Faculty of Agriculture, University of Zagreb alumni
Faculty of Political Sciences, University of Zagreb alumni
Foreign ministers of Croatia
People from Tomislavgrad